The Bet Israel Synagogue is located in Şişli, Istanbul, Turkey. Like the Neve Shalom Synagogue, Bet Israel is supported and governed by the Neve Shalom Foundation. The synagogue was initially built in the 1920s and enlarged into its present size in the early 1950s due to the majority of the Jewish population moving to that area and the immigration from Nazi occupied territories. It is currently the most populated synagogue in Turkey. The Bet Israel Synagogue can be visited by appointment with the Neve Shalom Foundation. There is also another synagogue in İzmir with the same name.

The synagogue was targeted in the 2003 Istanbul bombings.

See also
History of the Jews in Turkey
List of synagogues in Turkey

References

External links
Chief Rabbinate of Turkey
Shalom Newspaper - The main Jewish newspaper in Turkey

Synagogues in Istanbul
Şişli
Synagogues completed in 1925
1925 establishments in Turkey
20th-century religious buildings and structures in Turkey